Ruan Posheng (June 1916 – February 2, 2017) was a People's Republic of China politician. He was born in Yu County, Hebei. He was the 1st Chairman of the Shanxi People's Congress. He was a delegate to the 5th National People's Congress and 6th National People's Congress.

References

1916 births
2017 deaths
Chinese centenarians
Chinese Communist Party politicians from Hebei
Delegates to the 7th National Congress of the Chinese Communist Party
Delegates to the 5th National People's Congress
Delegates to the 6th National People's Congress
Men centenarians
People's Republic of China politicians from Hebei
People from Yu County, Hebei